The modern pentathlon at the 2000 Summer Olympics in Sydney was held from 30 September to 1 October 2000. The men's and women's events each involved 24 athletes. The venues for the events were The Dome and Exhibition Complex (fencing and shooting), the Sydney International Aquatic Centre (swimming), and Sydney Baseball Stadium (horse riding and cross-country running). For the first time in Olympic history, modern pentathlon at these Olympic games had the highest ratio of NOC representation with respect to its quota out of all the sports, and also, the women's event was officially included in the program.

Great Britain was also the most successful nation, topping the medal table with two medals. Stephanie Cook of Great Britain won the inaugural women's event. Her compatriot Kate Allenby took the bronze medal, while Emily de Riel of the United States claimed the silver. The Eastern European nations, on the other hand, dominated the men's event, as Dmitry Svatkovsky of Russia won the gold, followed by Hungary's Gábor Balogh and Belarus' Pavel Dovgal, who each obtained silver and bronze medals, respectively.

Format
Modern pentathlon contained five events; pistol shooting, épée fencing, 200 m freestyle swimming, show jumping, and a 3 km cross-country run. They were held in that order, with each segment awarding points to competitors based on their performance in the segment.  The points from each of the events were summed to give a final ranking; in addition, the running segment at the end of the day used a staggered start designed so that the order in which runners finished would be the same as their ranking by total points.

Medalists

Medal summary

Medal table

References

External links
Official Olympic Report
Official Results

 
2000 Summer Olympics events
2000
2000 in modern pentathlon